Shale is a sedimentary rock.

Shale may also refer to:

Places 
Shalë (river), a river in northern Albania
Shalë, Albania, a municipal unit in Shkodër County, northern Albania
Shalë, the Albanian name for the Sedlare, settlement in the municipality of Vučitrn, Kosovska Mitrovica, Kosovo
Shalës, s municipality in Elbasan District, central Albania

Other uses 
Shale (horse), Irish Thoroughbred racehorse
Shale (surname)
Shales (surname)
Shale Framework (software), computer software
Shale oil
Oil shale

See also 
 
 Shali, Republic of Tatarstan, Russia
 Schale, a surname
 Shail (disambiguation)